A town is a human settlement that is generally  larger than a village but smaller than a city.

Town may also refer to:

People
 A. Hays Town (1903–2005), American architect
 David Town (born 1976), English footballer
 Harold Town (1924–1990), Canadian abstract painter
 Hiram S. Town (1832–1901), American farmer and politician
 Ithiel Town (1784–1844), American architect and civil engineer
 Phil Town (born 1948), American investor and motivational speaker
 Gustavus Town Kirby (1874–1956), American leader on sports committees

Places

United Kingdom
 Town (Newcastle-under-Lyme ward), an electoral ward in Staffordshire, England
 Town (Enfield ward), a Greater London electoral ward
 Town (Hammersmith and Fulham ward), a Greater London electoral ward
 Town, Merthyr Tydfil, a community and ward in Wales
 Town Loch, a loch in Fife, Scotland

United States
 Town Creek (disambiguation), several communities and waterways 
 Town Lake, a reservoir on the Colorado River in Austin, Texas
 Town River, a river in Plymouth County, Massachusetts
 Town Cove, a New England beach in Eastham, Massachusetts

Other places
 Town Reach, a section of the Brisbane River, Queensland, Australia
 Town Island, an island in the New Territories of Hong Kong
 Town Island (Lake of the Woods), an island in Ontario, Canada
 Town Abyssal Plain, a submarine topographical feature in the South Atlantic

Other uses
 Town class (disambiguation), a list of types of ships
 Town (magazine), a British men's magazine of the 1950s and 60s
 "Town" (song), a 1996 song by Northern Uproar
 TOWN, a working title for the 2019 Game Freak role-playing game Little Town Hero
 In New York State, a civil township, a division of a county, with its own government.

See also
 Taun (disambiguation)
 The Town (disambiguation)
 This Town (disambiguation)
 Ton (disambiguation)
 Toon (disambiguation)
 Townes (disambiguation)
 Towns (disambiguation)
 Township (disambiguation)